Admiral Wannakuwatta Waduge Erwin Clancy Fernando VSV, USP, MSc, ndc, psc, MNI, SLN  (In Sinhalese: ක්ලැන්සි ෆර්නැන්ඩෝ) (10 October 1938 – 16 November 1992) was the Commander of the Sri Lanka Navy from 1 November 1991 to 16 November 1992. He was assassinated by the LTTE in 1992, as the most senior officer in the Sri Lankan military to be killed in the line of duty.

Education
Admiral Fernando received his secondary education at Prince of Wales' College, Moratuwa. He was a member of the team Western Band Prince of Wales' College, Moratuwa. He held the memberships of the British Institute of Management, and the Nautical Institute and had obtained a master's degree in defence studies. He  had also been conferred with the certificate of Master Mariners and was the first President of Sri Lanka Branch of the Nautical Institute.

Naval career
After completing his schooling he enlisted as a cadet officer in the Royal Ceylon Navy in December 1957. After completing basic training, he proceeded for training at Britannia Royal Naval College in Dartmouth, United Kingdom. On his return he served with the Royal Ceylon Navy in Trincomalee, Tangalle and Karainagar, serving on board HMCyS Aliya and HMCyS Gajabahu, the flagship of the fleet. He served as the commanding officer of HMCyS Diyakawa, SLNS Ranakamee and the SLNS Samudra Devi, which was the flagship of the fleet in 1980. During his service years, he introduced the Sinhala communication system into the navy and authored the book on ‘Customs and etiquettes of Services’. In 1977, he attended Defence Services Staff College, Wellington. Promoted to the rank of Commander in March 1978, he was the Commanding Officer of the SLNS Tissa and thereafter SLNS Elara, and served as the Master of the Ceylon Shipping Corporations MV Lanka Kanthi.

On 30 June 1983, he was appointed Director Naval Operations. Promoted the rank of Captain on 1 January 1984, he was appointed Commandant of the Naval and Maritime Academy. He was promoted to Commodore in July 1986 and served as Commander Western Naval Area, Commander Eastern Naval Area, and Security Forces Commander, Trincomalee. In 1987, he attended the National Defence College in New Delhi. In 1991, he was promoted to the rank of rear admiral and held the post of the Chief of Staff of the navy, shortly he was promoted to the rank of vice admiral on appointment to the office of the Commander of the Sri Lanka Navy on 1 November 1991. After becoming navy commander he intensified naval operations against the LTTE, effectively denying the terrorist free use of the sea.

Assassination 
He was assassinated by a LTTE suicide bomber who drove an explosives laden motorbike into his staff car on the 16 November 1992 at 8.35 a.m, in front of the Galle Face Green. Killed in the bombing was Lieutenant (posthumously lieutenant-commander) Sandun Gunasekera, his flag lieutenant and his driver. He was on his way to naval headquarters at Flagstaff Street in the Galle Buck from his official residence "Navy House" at Longden Place, Colombo after he returned from India after discussing Indo-Sri Lankan naval cooperation.

Honors
He was posthumously promoted to Admiral and awarded the Vishista Seva Vibhushanaya and the Uttama Seva Padakkama. While in service he had received the Sri Lanka Armed Services Long Service Medal and Clasp, Republic of Sri Lanka Armed Services Medal, Ceylon Armed Services Long Service Medal and Clasp, Purna Bhumi Padakkama, President's Inauguration Medal and the Sri Lanka Navy 25th Anniversary Medal.

Family
He was married to Monica Fernando and had two sons, Nishan and Dinukh.

See also
Sri Lanka Navy
List of assassinations of the Sri Lankan Civil War
List of attacks attributed to the LTTE
Sri Lankan Civil War

References

External links
www.admiralclancyfernando.org
Sri Lanka Navy
Admiral W.W.E.C. Fernando ndc, psc, VSV - Sri Lanka Navy
Glimpses of an admirable Admiral
 Admiral Clancy Fernando in Sinhala

1938 births
1992 deaths
Sri Lankan admirals
Assassinated military personnel
Assassinated Sri Lankan people
Sri Lankan military personnel killed in action
Graduates of Britannia Royal Naval College
Terrorist incidents in Sri Lanka in 1992
Suicide bombings in Sri Lanka
Commanders of the Navy (Sri Lanka)
People killed during the Sri Lankan Civil War
Alumni of Prince of Wales' College, Moratuwa
Sinhalese military personnel
National Defence College, India alumni
Indian Peace Keeping Force